The 2022 Lincoln Memorial Railsplitters men's volleyball team represents Lincoln Memorial University in the 2022 NCAA Division I & II men's volleyball season. The Railsplitters, led by fifth year head coach John Cash, play their home games at Mary Mars Gymnasium. The Railsplitters compete as an Independent.

Roster

Schedule

 *-Indicates conference match.
 Times listed are Eastern Time Zone.

Broadcasters
Purdue Fort Wayne: Adam Haley
King: Adam Haley
Loyola Chicago: Adam Haley
McKendree: Adam Haley
Erskine: Adam Haley
Emmanuel: Adam Haley
Queens: Adam Haley
Limestone: Adam Haley
Hawaii: Kanoa Leahey & Ryan Tsuji
Hawaii: Kanoa Leahey & Ryan Tsuji 
Tusculum: 
Ohio State: 
Ohio State: 
Lindenwood: 
McKendree: 
Quincy: Adam Haley
Emmanuel: 
Queens: 
Limestone: 
King: 
Alderson Broaddus: 
Tusculum: Adam Haley

Rankings 

^The Media did not release a Pre-season poll.

Honors
Johansen Negron won the January 31 Independent Teams Player of the Week award.
On February 7 Lincoln Memorial became the first independent ever to be ranked in the AVCA Top 15 when they achieved the #15 ranking, the first time the Railsplitters have ever been ranked.

References

2022 in sports in Tennessee
2022 NCAA Division I & II men's volleyball season